Sabzabad (also Romanized as Sabzābād; also known as Ḩājjī Sarv ‘Alī) is a village in Vardasht Rural District, in the Central District of Semirom County, Isfahan Province, Iran. At the 2006 census, its population was 114, in 26 families.

References 

Populated places in Semirom County